Penicillium piceum is an anamorph species of fungi in the genus Penicillium which can cause in rare cases chronic granulomatous disease. This species has been isolated from human blood cultures and from pig lung tissue. Penicillium piceum produces β-glucosidase

Further reading

References 

piceum
Fungi described in 1948